Carissima is a Venezuelan telenovela written by Julio César Mármol and produced by RCTV in 2001. The telenovela lasted 103 episodes and was distributed internationally by RCTV International.

Roxana Díaz and Carlos Montilla starred as the main protagonists with Maricarmen Regueiro, Franklin Virgüez and Carolina Tejera as antagonists.

Plot
Gabriel discovers his father has been murdered, and the suspected killer is Monserrat Vallemorín (alias Moncho), a powerful man in the underworld of organized crime, his family's enemy and the supposed godfather of Avril. Gabriel decides to take revenge for his father Ulises Santuario by focusing on Monserrat's two loves: Marbella, his foster daughter and Avril.

Avril is a young medical doctor struggling to find a job, but she refuses Monserrat's help as she suspects his illegal businesses. Monserrat takes an interest in Avril and tries to show her affection in every way possible, arousing the jealousy of Marbella who feels her foster father loves Avril more than her, and she decides to make Avril suffer. Unknown to Marbella, Avril is actually Monserrat's biological daughter from his past relationship with Thania Guzmán. Monserrat took Avril as a baby from Thania and gave her to Antonio Zurli, an Italian immigrant who fled the mafia and whom Monserrat helped to change identity and settle in Venezuela where he hired him as his gardener. Moncho hides Avril's true identity to prevent his enemies and his wife's family from harming her. On the other hand, Thania had another child with Moncho but hid the truth from him fearing he'd take her away. She gave the child, Adriana, to another family.

Under a false name, Gabriel integrates himself into the lives of Marbella and Avril as he plots his revenge, but he never expected to fall madly in love with Avril.

Cast
Roxana Díaz as Avril Zurli Gavazzeni
Carlos Montilla as Gabriel Enrique Santuario Moro
Maricarmen Regueiro as Yermaní Vallemorín / Yermaní Burgos Urquia
Franklin Virgüez as Montserrat Vallemorín Martínez
Carlos Cámara Jr. as Antonio Zurli
Carolina Tejera as Marbella Vallemorín
Carlos Márquez as Felipe Vallemorín
Dalila Colombo as Esmeralda Aquino / Thania Guzmán
Félix Loreto as Ulises Santuario Cedeña
Chantal Baudaux as Adriana Libordo
Gabriel Fernández as Tito Santuario
Manuel Salazar as Domingo Libordo
Francis Rueda as Esther Moro de Santuario
Alberto Rowinski as Erasmo de la Franchesca
Leopoldo Regnault as Dr. Gregorio Alemán
Martín Lantigua as Álvaro Burgos Caicedo
Verónica Ortíz as Valentina Ávila
Estefanía López as Melani Santuario
Jerónimo Gil as Héctor Coronel
Reina Hinojosa as Messalina
Verónica Cortéz as Tarcisia de Zurli
Violeta Alemán as Martha Forero
Enrique Izquierdo as Santiago Santuario
Jeanette Flores as Marisol Santana
Samuel González as Humberto "Kiko" Zurli
Marianela González as Marni Zurli
Sandy Olivares as Omar Santuario''
Magaly Serrano as Versuka Santuario

References

External links

2001 telenovelas
RCTV telenovelas
Venezuelan telenovelas
2001 Venezuelan television series debuts
2001 Venezuelan television series endings
Spanish-language telenovelas
Television shows set in Caracas